The 2012 Missouri Attorney General election was held on November 6, 2012, alongside the presidential and gubernatorial elections. The incumbent Missouri Attorney General Chris Koster, a Democrat, won re-election for a second full term against Republican attorney Ed Martin. As of 2022, this is the last time a Democrat was elected Attorney General of Missouri.

Background
Koster was originally elected as attorney general in 2008 as a Democrat after switching from the Republican Party. Koster won despite accusations that his campaign violated state law in raising money from multiple committees. He also survived the disclosure that he played a supporting role in a plagiarism episode that damaged Attorney General William L. Webster’s campaign for governor in 1992. Fresh out of law school, Koster worked for Webster, a Republican, as an assistant state attorney general.

He defeated State Representative Margaret Donnelly in the Democratic primary for the nomination for Missouri Attorney General and won against Republican state senator Michael R. Gibbons in the general election, 53%-47%. He was sworn in as attorney general on January 12, 2009, succeeding Jay Nixon, who had served since 1993.

Timeline
March 27, 2012 - Filing deadline for Democrats, Republicans and Libertarians
August 7, 2012 - Primary (gubernatorial and other statewide office) elections
August 21, 2012 - Filing deadline for other third parties and Independents
November 6, 2012 - General election.

Republican primary

Candidates

Declared 
 Ed Martin, attorney
 Adam Lee Warren, prosecuting attorney of Livingston County

Declined 
 Cole McNary, state representative

Polling

Results
100% reporting (3,420 of 3,420 precincts)

Martin, who served as chief of staff for Governor Matt Blunt from 2006 until November 2007, won the Republican primary in a landslide, 72%-28% and become the party's nominee.

Democratic primary

Candidates

Declared 
Chris Koster, incumbent Attorney General since 2008

Koster was unopposed for the Democratic nomination.

General election

Polling

Results

On election day, Koster defeated Martin by a wide margin of over 14 percentage points, an increase from his 5% margin of victory in 2008. This is despite Republican Mitt Romney defeating Democratic President Barack Obama in the concurrent presidential election in Missouri, although other incumbent state Democratic officials were re-elected as well. Governor Jay Nixon won re-election by more than 12 percentage points, Senator Claire McCaskill won re-election by over 15 percentage points, and Clint Zweifel won by 5 percentage points. Jason Kander was also elected Secretary of State by just over one percentage point.

See also
 2012 United States presidential election in Missouri
 2012 United States Senate election in Missouri
 2012 United States House of Representatives elections in Missouri
 2012 Missouri gubernatorial election
 2012 Missouri lieutenant gubernatorial election
 2012 Missouri State Treasurer election
 2012 Missouri Secretary of State election

References

External links
Elections from the Missouri Secretary of State

Official campaign websites
Chris Koster for Attorney General
Ed Martin for Attorney General

Attorney General
Missouri
Missouri Attorney General elections